The 2014 French Super Series will be the tenth super series tournament of the 2014 BWF Super Series. The tournament will be contested in Paris, France from October 21–26, 2014 and had a total purse of $275,000. A qualification will occur to fill four places in all five disciplines of the main draws.

Men's singles

Seeds 

  Lee Chong Wei (withdrew)
  Jan Ø. Jørgensen
  Kenichi Tago
  Tommy Sugiarto
  Wang Zhengming
  Hans-Kristian Vittinghus
  Hu Yun
  Viktor Axelsen

Top half

Bottom half

Finals

Women's singles

Seeds 

  Li Xuerui
  Wang Shixian
  Wang Yihan
  Ratchanok Intanon
  Saina Nehwal
  Carolina Marín
  Tai Tzu-ying
  Pusarla Venkata Sindhu

Top half

Bottom half

Finals

Men's doubles

Seeds 

  Mathias Boe / Carsten Mogensen
  Hiroki Endo / Kenichi Hayakawa
  Lee Sheng-mu / Tsai Chia-hsin
  Gideon Markus Fernaldi / Markis Kido
  Liu Xiaolong / Qiu Zihan
  Fu Haifeng / Zhang Nan
  Chai Biao / Hong Wei
  Maneepong Jongjit / Nipitphon Puangpuapech

Top half

Bottom half

Finals

Women's doubles

Seeds 

  Bao Yixin / Tang Jinhua
  Christina Pedersen / Kamilla Rytter Juhl
  Misaki Matsutomo / Ayaka Takahashi
  Tian Qing / Zhao Yunlei
  Ma Jin / Tang Yuanting
  Reika Kakiiwa / Miyuki Maeda
  Wang Xiaoli / Yu Yang
  Luo Ying / Luo Yu

Top half

Bottom half

Finals

Mixed doubles

Seeds 

  Zhang Nan / Zhao Yunlei
  Xu Chen / Ma Jin
  Tontowi Ahmad / Lilyana Natsir
  Chris Adcock / Gabrielle Adcock
  Michael Fuchs / Birgit Michels
  Sudket Prapakamol / Saralee Thoungthongkam
  Lu Kai / Huang Yaqiong
  Danny Bawa Chrisnanta / Vanessa Neo Yu Yan

Top half

Bottom half

Finals

References

External links
 French Open at www.yonexifb.com

French Super Series
French Super Series
International sports competitions hosted by Paris
French Open (badminton)